Hartle is a surname. Notable people with the surname include:

Adam Hartle (born 1979), an American comedian
Barry Hartle (born 1939), an English footballer
Dean Hartle (1931-2018), an American politician
Enid Hartle (1935–2008), an English opera singer
Greg Hartle (born 1951), a former American football player
James Hartle (born 1939), an American physicist
John Hartle (1933–1968), an English professional road racer
John A. Hartle (1891–1979), an American politician
Roy Hartle (1931–2014), an English footballer
Russell P. Hartle (1889–1961), an American army officer
Tom Hartle, an American publisher
Sophie Hartle,
Gabriella Hartle,
Bernita Hartle,
Imogen Hartle,
Madison Hartle,

Places
Hartleton, Pennsylvania, borough, United States
Surnames from given names